The Stone Foxes is an American rock and roll band based in San Francisco, California, United States.

History
The Stone Foxes originated in the foothills of California's Central Valley where founding members Aaron Mort and brothers Spence Koehler (guitar) and Shannon Koehler (drums, vocals) grew up. After high school, they went to college at San Francisco State University.

A couple of years later, after living with the three founding members and discovering their similar musical tastes, Avi Vinocur (guitar, bass) joined the band.

Formed in late 2005, The Stone Foxes spent their first few years together working on balancing out their musical style. The end product (for now) is a style infused with country, rock, blues, and a touch of San Francisco. The group's songs are full of classic blues structures and shout-along moments.

In April 2011, keyboardist Elliott Peltzman joined the band. Later that year, they opened for Cage The Elephant and Grammy winners The Black Keys at Mesa Amphitheatre in Phoenix, Arizona. Their cover of Slim Harpo's "I'm A King Bee" was featured in the national ad campaign for Jack Daniel's Tennessee Honey.

In 2013, following the departures of Aaron Mort and Avi Vinocur, the band underwent a major change in personnel marked by the additions of multi-instrumentalist Brian Bakalian, singer/guitarist/bassist Vince Dewald, and guitarist/violinist Ben Andrews. The new lineup released the album Small Fires that same year, featuring the singles "Everybody Knows," Ulysses Jones," and "Cotto."

On their fourth album, The Stone Foxes took a different approach to releasing their new music, launching Foxes First Friday. Beginning with "Locomotion" on September 5, 2014, the band detailed plans to release a new song for free on the first Friday of every month. Coupled with live versions, bonus tracks, and photos from the road, each song was compiled into an album titled Twelve Spells, which was released in August 2015. That same year, the band was covered in Forbes for their DIY success that came without the help of a record label.

In February 2016 The Stone Foxes embarked on their first UK tour with Bath-based, Zambian brother duo Bite The Buffalo. Most dates on the tour sold out.

In 2017, the band released the Visalia EP, a collection of songs they created while camping in the town of the same name. Singles included "Fight," "Shake Like Buddy Holly," and the autobiographical "If I Die Tonight," about lead singer/drummer Shannon Koehler's lifelong struggle with a congenital heart condition.

On September 18, 2018, the band announced members Elliott Peltzman, Brian Bakalian, and Vince Dewald would be leaving the band. The band continued with a new lineup of Shannon and Spence Koehler. That year, The Stone Foxes released two singles, "City on the Water" and "Gimme Some Truth". The following year in 2019, they released another single entitled "Death of Me".

During 2020 the band released two more singles, "Can't Go Back" and "Patriots" as well as an EP entitled Gold. Gold, released on February 28, 2020, features five tracks that center around themes of deception, greed, and loss. The band's latest release is a new single entitled "Electric Stomp", released in 2021.

The Stone Foxes' music has been featured in numerous television, movie, advertisement, and radio slots. Some accolades include the feature of their track "Hyde and Pine" in the 2018 Oscar-winning film Free Solo, their song "Young Man" being included on season one, episode twelve of Fox's Deputy, and multiple songs being featured on a variety of episodes of FX's Sons of Anarchy.

The band has also played at many well-known festivals and supported noteworthy artists. Credits include playing at Outside Lands, VooDoo Music Experience, SXSW, and performing with artists such as The Black Keys, Cage the Elephant, and ZZ Top.

Philanthropy 
The Stone Foxes have founded the Goodnight Moon Project to combat homelessness. The band has also partnered with SuperFood Drive to collect and donate healthy food at their shows to those locally in need.

Current Members 
Current members of the band are
 Shannon Koehler // Vocals, Harmonica, Drums
 Spence Koehler // Guitar, Vocals

Past Members 

 Aaron Mort // Vocals, Guitar, Bass
 Avi Vinocur // Vocals, Guitar,
 Vince Dewald // Vocals, Bass, Guitar
 Ben Andrews // Guitar, Violin, Vocals
 Brian Bakalian // Drums, Bass, Guitar, Vocals
 Elliott Peltzman // Keys, Vocals Bass, Drums

Honorary Members 

Marc Engesether // Tech

Appearances in Media

TV
Shameless (Showtime)
Sons of Anarchy (FX)
Ray Donovan (Sky)
Elementary (CBS)
NFL on Fox (Fox)
NASCAR (Fox)
Bar Rescue (Spike)
Body Language (Showtime)
Legit (FXX)
The Returned (A&E)
White Collar Brawlers (Esquire)
Deputy (Fox)

Film 
12 Men of Christmas
Conception
Abel's Field
Free Solo

Advertisements 
The band has appeared in advertisements:
 Jack Daniel's
 BMW
Quiksilver Snow
Ariat Boots
RIDGID TOOLS
JanSport
Clif Bar, GreenNotes partnership
Budweiser

Video Games 
 Tap Tap Revenge

Radio
The band was featured on NPR's "World Cafe: Next" in July 2010. "Mr. Hangman" off Bears & Bulls was in Power Rotation on X103.9 Phoenix, and Bears & Bulls peaked at No. 4 on FMQB's Sub Modern albums chart, with single "Stomp" coming in at No. 7.

Discography

Albums and EPs
Black Rolling Thunder (2006)
The Stone Foxes (2008)
Bears & Bulls (2010)
Small Fires (2013)
Twelve Spells (2015)
Live from the Loin (2016)
Visalia EP (2017)
Gold EP (2020)
On the Other Side (2022)

Compilation albums
New Tales to Tell: A Tribute to Love and Rockets (Justice Records) (2009): "Fever"

Singles
"Stomp" (2010)
"Mr. Hangman" (2010)
"Psycho" (2011)
"Everybody Knows" (2012)
"Eye for Love" (2015)
"Fight" (2017)
"Shake Like Buddy Holly" (2017)
"City on the Water" (2018)
"Gimme Some Truth" (2018)
"Death of Me" (2019)
"Can't Go Back" (2020)
"Patriots" (two-song single, 2020)
"Electric Stomp" (2021)

Cover versions
Rollin and Tumblin, Muddy Waters
I'm a King Bee, Slim Harpo
Little Red Rooster, Willie Dixon
Spoonful, Willie Dixon
Gimme Some Truth, John Lennon
Fever, Love and Rockets

References

External links

Official website
The Stone Foxes on MySpace
The Stone Foxes on YouTube
AudioMuffin Review
LAist Article
Punk Review
Real Detroit Weekly's Review of Bears and Bulls

Rock music groups from California
Musical groups from San Francisco
Musical groups established in 2005